The 1999 Tour de Langkawi was the 4th edition of the Tour de Langkawi, a cycling stage race that took place in Malaysia. It started on 3 February in Langkawi and ended on 14 February in Kuala Lumpur. The race was sanctioned by the Union Cycliste Internationale (UCI) as a 2.4 category race.

Italian Paolo Lanfranchi won the race, Sergei Ivanov of Russia second and Allan Iacoune of Australia third. Graeme Miller of New Zealand also won the points classification and Alessandro Petacchi of Italy won the mountains classification of the race.  won the team classification of the race.

Stages
The cyclist competed in 12 stages with a prologue over 12 days, covering a distance of 1,903.3 kilometres.

Classification leadership

Final standings

General classification

Points classification

Mountains classification

Asian rider classification

Team classification

Asian team classification

References

1999
1999 in road cycling
1999 in Malaysian sport
February 1999 sports events in Asia